Chinese Bank may refer to:

List of Chinese banks
Hongkong Chinese Bank: a defunct bank in Hong Kong, now merged to CITIC Ka Wah Bank
Macau Chinese Bank: a bank in Macau
 Chinese American Bank, an overseas Chinese bank in the United States headquartered in New York City, with branch offices in Chinatown, Manhattan and in Chinatown, Flushing
 Chinese Central Bank
 Chinese Development Bank